The Union Passenger Station in Tacoma, Washington, United States, opened in 1911. It was listed on the National Register of Historic Places in 1974. It now serves as a courthouse of the United States District Court for the Western District of Washington. The distinctive architecture, dominated by a copper dome, is a landmark for the area.

Building history
Tacoma's reputation as the "City of Destiny" began when it was chosen by the Northern Pacific Company in 1873 as the western terminus of the northern route of the transcontinental railroad, then under construction. The city became a center for industrial and commercial development. Its economy expanded rapidly over the next two decades, and its population skyrocketed from just under 2,000 in 1873 to 37,714 in 1890.

The city's first rail station was built in 1883, then moved to the site of the present Union Station on Pacific Avenue and enlarged in 1892. In 1906 the architectural firm of Reed and Stem was selected to design a new station more befitting Tacoma's image as a prosperous, thriving metropolis and railway terminus of the Northwest.

Construction of Union Station began in 1909 and was completed on May 1, 1911. Acclaim for Reed and Stem's design was immediate. The Tacoma Daily Ledger praised it as "the largest, the most modern and in all ways the most beautiful and best equipped passenger station in the Pacific Northwest".

Despite optimistic forecasts by the railroad companies early in the century, the future would not be kind to the passenger rail industry. Railway ridership peaked in the 1930s and again during World War II, then quickly declined as the automobile became America's preferred mode of transportation. The façade of Union Station was damaged by the April 29, 1965, earthquake that struck the Puget Sound region. The station was evacuated after bricks and masonry fell from the building onto the sidewalk in front of Pacific Avenue.

On May 1, 1971, Amtrak took over national passenger services from private railroads, including several operated by the Burlington Northern Railroad (the successor to Northern Pacific) that stopped at Union Station. The Tacoma offices relocated to Seattle and Amtrak built a new Tacoma station on Puyallup Avenue east of Freighthouse Square. The last passenger train left Union Station on June 14, 1984, and the abandoned building soon fell into disrepair. In 1987, Congress authorized the U.S. General Services Administration (GSA) to lease Union Station for 30 years to provide space for the United States District Court for the Western District of Washington. After three years of work, the historic building was completely renovated and restored, and a three-story addition was constructed. The federal courts began occupancy in 1992 and were deemed a successful adaptive use of the landmark train station.

Today, the building is used for courts as well as public and private events. Ownership of the building was transferred to the GSA on August 10, 2022, for $1 following the execution of an option in the 30-year lease. An adjacent light rail station is named after Union Station and serves commuters as part of Tacoma Link.

Architecture

Tacoma Union Station is an example of Beaux-Arts architecture that combines awe-inspiring elegance with spatial efficiency. The architecture firm, Reed and Stem, were already well known in the field of railroad station design, particularly for their organization of space and movement. At the same time, Union Station was under construction, they collaborated with two other architects to design the Beaux-Arts style Grand Central Terminal in New York City.

The building's focal point is its ninety-foot-high central dome, which is part of the Tacoma skyline. Clad in copper and adorned with four large cartouches, the dome rests on a central pavilion with large arched openings on each side. Flat-roofed symmetrical wings flank the pavilion to the north and south. The exterior of the reinforced-concrete building is faced with multicolored red brick set in a Flemish-bond pattern, with a limestone base and ornamental detail. The entrance doors, of stained oak with bronze hardware, are recessed within the arch on the west elevation. A large window fills the arch above the doors.

The dome creates a rotunda in the building's interior, which is visited by up to 300 people a day during the summer season. Shortly after the building's completion in 1911, the dome's skylight began to leak, causing serious problems during the heavy rains regularly experienced in the Northwest. The skylight was eventually covered over, but the leakage—and the structural and cosmetic damage it caused—continued, growing more severe in the decades that followed. Concerns over falling plaster ultimately prompted officials to close the rotunda to the public in the early 1980s. It remained closed until the building was renovated in the early 1990s for its new use as a federal courthouse.
	
The rotunda has skylights and houses a collection of glass art by renowned Tacoma artist Dale Chihuly. Suspended from the center of the domed ceiling is Chihuly's  chandelier that comprises over 2,700 cobalt-colored, balloon-like glass globes. The rotunda also retains historically significant features, including a large clock, marble water fountains, and wooden benches.

Other features of the original design were a pneumatic tube system and elevators installed between the rotunda and the baggage room so that a traveler's luggage would be delivered to the lobby via early 20th century automation.

Most of the railroad tracks and platforms and part of the original concourse were removed during the rehabilitation for the federal courts. A simple, three-story addition, designed by Tacoma architects Merrit and Pardini in collaboration with TRA Architects of Seattle was completed in 1992. The sympathetic addition is located to the north and east of the original building. The two buildings are separated by a courtyard but linked by an interior connector, which extends from the east side of the rotunda.

Ten courtrooms were needed for the federal courts. Two were created within the north and south wings of the 1911 building, while the addition provided eight more. The courtrooms are designed so that each can be used, inter-changeably, for District, Bankruptcy, or Magistrate proceedings.

Union Station was listed on the National Register of Historic Places in 1974. Six years later, a seven-block area surrounding the station, known as the Union Station Warehouse District, was added to the National Register. The renovation and the addition have received several preservation awards.

Timeline

1883: Tacoma's first rail station is built.
1892: As railroad use increases, the station is moved to the Pacific Avenue site, and enlarged.
1909–1911: Union Station is constructed on the site of the 1892 station.
1940s–1960s: As the automobile becomes increasingly popular, the passenger rail industry begins a prolonged decline.
1974: Union Station is listed on the National Register of Historic Places.
1980: The seven-block area surrounding Union Station is designated a historic district and listed on the National Register of Historic Places.
1984: The last passenger train departs from Union Station and the building is abandoned.
1987: The U.S. General Services Administration, with Congressional authorization, arranges a 35-year lease of the building from the city of Tacoma.
1990–1992: Union Station is rehabilitated and converted for use as a courthouse. An addition provides more space for use by the courts.
2003: The Union Station/South 19th Street station opens on Tacoma Link, restoring rail service to the building's location.

Building facts
Architects: Reed and Stem
Renovation and Restoration: Merritt+Pardini in association with TRA (The Richardson Associates)
Courthouse Addition: Merritt+Pardini and Bassetti Norton Metler Rekevics
Construction Dates: 1909–1911; Courthouse addition: 1992
Landmark Status: Listed in the National Register of Historic Places; contributing building in the Union Depot-Warehouse Historic District
Location: 1717 Pacific Avenue
Architectural Style: Beaux-Arts
Primary Materials: Brick and concrete with copper roof/dome and limestone trim
Prominent Features: Ninety-foot copper dome and interior rotunda; Glass art displays by Tacoma native Dale Chihuly

See also
 Milwaukee Road Depot

References

Attribution

External links

 City of Tacoma Walking Tour
 Official Chihuly Installation
 Union Station Rotunda Organization

Transportation in Tacoma, Washington
National Register of Historic Places in Tacoma, Washington
Railway stations on the National Register of Historic Places in Washington (state)
Former Northern Pacific Railway stations in Washington (state)
Former Amtrak stations in Washington (state)
Tacoma, Washington
Railway stations in the United States opened in 1911
Railway stations closed in 1984
Reed and Stem buildings
Beaux-Arts architecture in Washington (state)
Domes
Federal courthouses in the United States
Courthouses in Washington (state)
Buildings and structures in Tacoma, Washington
1911 establishments in Washington (state)
1984 disestablishments in Washington (state)
Railway stations in Pierce County, Washington
Former Union Pacific Railroad stations in Washington (state)
Former Great Northern Railway (U.S.) stations
Repurposed railway stations in the United States